USS Accomac may refer to the following ships operated by the United States Navy:

, was the second name of a small harbor tugboat commissioned 2 April 1898 as Algonquin.
, was an  that was later converted to a self-propelled barracks ship.
, a  large harbor tug in service from 1971 until 2012.

United States Navy ship names